Hamilton TMD was a traction maintenance depot located in Hamilton, South Lanarkshire, Scotland. The depot was situated on the Argyle Line and was near Hamilton West station.

History 
Before its closure in 1982, Class 06 and 08 shunters and Class 101, 107 and 116 DMUs could be seen at the depot.

References 

 Railway depots in Scotland